I Yeongsuk may refer to:

Lee Young-sook (born 1965), South Korean sprinter
Lee Young-suk (born 1970), South Korean badminton player